The CFR Class 47 is a class of electric locomotives built for the Romanian Railways for use on the Romanian electrified network. They were originally built by Electroputere from 1965 to 1991 and designated as the CFR class 40 or 41. All Class 47 locomotives were modernized by Softronic from 2007. They are operated both by CFR Marfǎ and CFR Cǎlǎtori.

History 
The locomotives are essentially a rebuild/modernisation of the CFR Class EA that were built from the mid 1960s to the early 1990s by the Craiova locomotive works. Starting with the mid 1990s, it was decided to rebuild a number of locomotives, a number of them being modernised between 1998 and 2002 by Siemens-Secheron, resulting in CFR Class 45. The project however was stopped and it wasn't until 2006 when PROMAT and Softronic decided to rebuild a number of locomotives for freight use. Starting in 2007, the passenger locomotive modernisations began as well, but only by Softronic. Modernisation continues, but it is uncertain if it will be stopped or continued as only a small number of locomotives have been modernised in the past years.

Operation 
As of 2013, there are over 100 Class 47 locomotives currently in service. They are used by both CFR Marfǎ and CFR Călători. They are the most powerful locomotives built in Romania.

Passenger locomotives
ASEA locomotives
Electroputere locomotives
Co′Co′ locomotives
25 kV AC locomotives
Electric locomotives of Romania
Standard gauge locomotives of Romania
Railway locomotives introduced in 2006
Co′Co′ electric locomotives of Europe